Alejandro Herrera (born 21 April 1958) is a Cuban athlete. He competed in the men's triple jump at the 1980 Summer Olympics.

References

1958 births
Living people
Athletes (track and field) at the 1980 Summer Olympics
Cuban male triple jumpers
Olympic athletes of Cuba
Place of birth missing (living people)
Central American and Caribbean Games medalists in athletics
20th-century Cuban people